Events from the year 1964 in Romania. The year saw increasing separation from Soviet influence.

Incumbents
President of the State Council and General Secretary of the Romanian Communist Party: Gheorghe Gheorghiu-Dej.
Prime Minister: Ion Gheorghe Maurer.

Events
 3 March – Gheorghe Gheorghiu-Dej travels to Beijing for seven days negotiation with the Chinese government.
 22 April – The Central Committee of the Romanian Workers' Party declares independence from the Communist Party in the Soviet Union. This was the first post-war declaration of Romanian economic, political and social sovereignty from the Soviet Union.
 5 May – Romania establishes diplomatic relations at an embassy level with Tanganyika, opening an embassy in Dar es Salaam.
 4 August – Alexandru Todea has his life sentence remitted and is released from prison. He goes on to become  Archbishop of Făgăraș and Alba Iulia.
 7 September – Construction commences on the Iron Gate Hydroelectric Power Station.

Births
 20 January – Vasile Tomoiagă,  rower, silver medal winner at the 1984 and 1988 Summer Olympics.
 28 January –Rozalia Husti,  fencer, silver medal winner at the 1984 Summer Olympics.
 12 February – Dumitrița Turner,  artistic gymnast, silver medal winner at the 1980 Summer Olympics.
 4 March – Emilia Eberle, gymnast, silver medal winner at the 1980 Olympics.
 12 March – Alina Mungiu-Pippidi, political scientist, academic, journalist and writer.
 22 March – Ioana Badea, rower, gold medal winner at the 1984 Olympics.
 10 April – Elena Georgescu, coxswain, gold medal winner at the 1996, 2000 and 2004 Summer Olympics.
 13 July – Princess Maria, youngest daughter of King Michael I and Queen Anne.
 26 July – Dana Dragomir, pan flute player and composer.
 8 August – Elisabeta Tufan,  fencer, silver medal winner at the 1984 Summer Olympics.
 2 September – Ruxandra Donose, mezzo-soprano.
 26 October – Elisabeta Lipă,  rower, gold medal winner at the 1984, 1992, 1996, 2000 and 2004 Summer Olympics, as well as two silver and one bronze.
 4 December – Sevil Shhaideh, economist and politician.

Deaths
 2 March – Nicolae Vasilescu-Karpen, engineer and physicist (born 1870). 
 17 March – Păstorel Teodoreanu, humorist, poet, and gastronome (born 1894).
 11 April – Alexandru Ghika, mathematician, founder of the Romanian school of functional analysis (born 1902).
 2 June – Dumitru Caracostea, folklorist, literary historian, and critic (born 1879).
 6 June – Vasile Atanasiu, general in World War II (born 1886).
 6 July – Ion Vinea, poet and journalist (born 1895).
 25 July – Cornel Medrea, sculptor (born 1888).
 10 August – Visarion Puiu, metropolitan bishop of the Romanian Orthodox Church (born 1879).
 1 September – George Georgescu, composer (born 1887).
 13 November – Maria Antonescu, socialite and philanthropist (born 1892).

References

Years of the 20th century in Romania
1960s in Romania
1964 in Romania
Romania
Romania